Argent-sur-Sauldre (literally Argent on Sauldre) is a commune in the Cher department in the Centre-Val de Loire region of France.

Geography
The commune is on the border with the département of Loiret.

Population

Places of interest
 The church of St. André, dating from the 13th century.
 The 15th-century château of Saint-Maur, rebuilt between 1776 and 1778 by architect Victor Louis.
 A watermill.
 A museum at the chateau.

Personalities
Théophile Moreux, astronomer, was born here on November 20, 1867.

See also
Communes of the Cher department

References

Communes of Cher (department)
Berry, France